Christoph Grabinski (born 12 March 1990 in Schönebeck) is a German footballer, who currently plays for Einheit Rudolstadt.

Career 
He began his career 1. FC Magdeburg before 2008 moving to the youth from FC Carl Zeiss Jena, on 14 January 2009 was promoted to the first team.

References

1990 births
Living people
German footballers
FC Carl Zeiss Jena players
Sportspeople from Magdeburg
Association football midfielders
Footballers from Saxony-Anhalt